Lenoir County Courthouse is a historic courthouse located at Kinston, Lenoir County, North Carolina. It was built in 1939, and is a three-story, "H"-shaped, Moderne style building. It is faced with a limestone veneer and accented by streamlined, stylized ornament.  It features a tetrastyle in antis portico of square fluted piers.

It was listed on the National Register of Historic Places in 1979.

References

County courthouses in North Carolina
Courthouses on the National Register of Historic Places in North Carolina
Streamline Moderne architecture in the United States
Government buildings completed in 1939
Buildings and structures in Lenoir County, North Carolina
National Register of Historic Places in Lenoir County, North Carolina